The city of Wellington, capital of New Zealand, is investigating light rail as a potential future transport option. The Wellington tramway system originally operated in the city from 1878 to 1964.

Background
In 2008, a feasibility study produced by Greater Wellington Regional Council, the "Ngauranga to Wellington Airport Corridor Plan", outlined the possibility of  light rail being used as a solution to link Wellington CBD to Wellington International Airport.

Following the 2010 mayoral elections, Mayor Celia Wade-Brown pledged to investigate light rail between Wellington station and the airport. In August 2017 the Green Party updated its transport policy to introduce light rail from the city centre to Newtown by 2025 and the airport by 2027.
Mayor Justin Lester reaffirmed his support for light rail along the golden mile in 2018. In May 2019, the light rail line formed part of a $6.4 billion transport package known as "Let's Get Wellington Moving" announced by Lester, linking the city centre with the airport.

By 2020, no progress was made in planning of the system, however it was still included in the Green Party of New Zealand's transport policy.

In 2022, the New Zealand government committed to an estimated NZ$7.4 billion project consisting of a light rail network running from the Wellington city centre to the south coast and to the airport, along with a second Mount Victoria Tunnel. New Zealand's Finance Minister Grant Robertson stated that "the southern light rail option is our preferred choice for Wellington because of the significant potential it offers for new housing and neighborhood growth."

See also
 Trams in New Zealand
 Public transport in the Wellington Region
 Wellington tramway system
 Johnsonville Line (conversion to light rail was an option considered in 2008) 
 Light rail in Auckland

References

Light rail in New Zealand
Passenger rail transport in New Zealand
Proposed rail infrastructure in New Zealand
Rail transport in Wellington